The Zoologische Staatssammlung München (The Bavarian State Collection of Zoology) awards the Ritter-von-Spix-Medal to distinguished donors and benefactors of outstanding zoological collections. The German research institution has built up one of the largest natural history collections in the world with over 20 million zoological specimens.

The award is named after Johann Baptist von Spix, the institution's founder and first curator, and is granted sporadically since the 200th birthday of von Spix, 1981.

Award winners (since 2000)
 2013 - Philippe Darge
 2011 - Axel Alf
 2010 - Lutz W. R. Kobes
 2008 - Zoltán Varga
 2003 - Karl-Heinz Fuchs
 2003 - Heinz Politzar
 2001 - Thomas Witt, Museum Witt
 2001 - Claude Herbulot
 2000 - Ulf Eitschberger

External links
 The Bavarian State Collection of Zoology
 Biography of Johann Baptist von Spix

German awards